Māris Ziediņš (born 3 July 1978 in Talsi, Latvian SSR, Soviet Union) is a Latvian ice hockey forward currently playing for the Peterborough Phantoms of the English Premier Ice Hockey League.

Ziediņš spent four years in St. Norbert College before turning pro with the Rockford IceHogs of the United Hockey League.  He then went on to have spells in the ECHL with the Toledo Storm, Greenville Grrrowl and the Stockton Thunder before returning to the UHL with the Chicago Hounds.  In 2007, Ziediņš moved to the United Kingdom and signed with the Peterborough Phantoms.  In 2008–09, he scored 34 goals and 45 assists for 79 points in 54 games for the Phantoms.

Ziediņš represented Latvia in the 2005 World Ice Hockey Championship and the 2006 Winter Olympics.

Career statistics

Regular season and playoffs

International

External links

1978 births
Living people
Chicago Hounds (ice hockey team) players
English Premier Ice Hockey League players
Green Bay Gamblers players
Greenville Grrrowl players
Ice hockey players at the 2006 Winter Olympics
Latvian ice hockey forwards
Olympic ice hockey players of Latvia
People from Talsi
Rockford IceHogs (UHL) players
Stockton Thunder players
Toledo Storm players
St. Norbert College alumni